The toadstone, also known as bufonite (from Latin , "toad"), is a mythical stone or gem that was thought to be found in the head of a toad. It was supposed to be an antidote to poison and in this it is like batrachite, supposedly formed in the heads of frogs. Toadstones were actually the button-like fossilised teeth of Lepidotes, an extinct genus of ray-finned fish from the Jurassic and Cretaceous periods. They appeared to be "stones that are perfect in form" and were set by European jewellers into magical rings and amulets from Medieval times until the 18th century.

Beliefs
From ancient times people associated the fossils with jewels that were set inside the heads of toads. The toad has poison glands in its skin, so it was naturally assumed that they carried their own antidote and that this took the form of a magical stone. They were first recorded by Pliny the Elder in the first century.

According to Paul Taylor of the London Natural History Museum:

The true toadstone was taken by contemporary jewellers to be no bigger than the nail of a hand and they varied in colour from a whitish brown through green to black, depending on where they were buried. They were supposedly most effective against poison when worn against the skin, on which occasion they were thought to heat up, sweat and change colour. If a person were bitten by a venomous creature a toadstone would be touched against the affected part to effect a cure. Alternatively Johannes de Cuba, in his book Gart der Gesundheit of 1485, claimed that toadstone would help with kidney disease and earthly happiness.

Loose toadstones were discovered among other gemstones in the Elizabethan Cheapside Hoard and there are surviving toadstone rings in the Ashmolean Museum and the British Museum.

Allusions in literature
The toadstone is alluded to by Duke Senior in Shakespeare's As You Like It (1599), in Act 2, Scene 1, lines 12 to 14:
Sweet are the uses of adversity;
Which, like the toad, ugly and venomous,
Wears yet a precious jewel in his head.

In James Branch Cabell's short story "Balthazar's Daughter" (collected in The Certain Hour) and its subsequent play adaptation The Jewel Merchants, Alessandro de Medici attempts to seduce Graciosa by listing various precious jewels in his possession, including "jewels cut from the brain of a toad".

See also 

 Bezoar
 Biomineralization

References

Further reading
 New Oxford American Dictionary, under the entry "toadstone".
 The Complete Works of William Shakespeare by Crown Publishers Inc

External links
 "Toadstones: A note to Pseudodoxia Epidemica, Book III, chapter 13"
 A collection of notes maintained by James Eason of the University of Chicago comprising excerpts from Thomas Nicols and other authors
 New York Times reference, October 1890
 Whitehurst, John (1713-1788). An inquiry into the original state and formation of the earth, pp 184-5, 190 and ff).

Folklore
Toads
Mythological substances
Lepisosteiformes
Magic items